797 Montana, provisional designation , is a stony asteroid from the middle region of the asteroid belt, approximately 22 kilometers in diameter. It was discovered on 17 November 1914, by Danish astronomer Holger Thiele at Bergedorf Observatory in Hamburg, Germany. It was later named for the discovering observatory.

Classification and orbit 

Montana is a stony asteroid that orbits the Sun in the middle main-belt at a distance of 2.4–2.7 AU once every 4.04 years (1,474 days). Its orbit has an eccentricity of 0.06 and an inclination of 5° with respect to the ecliptic. The first identification at Heidelberg dates back to 1898, while the asteroid's observation arc begins two months after its discovery with the first used observation made at Bergedorf in 1915.

Physical characteristics 

In both the Tholen and SMASS taxonomy, Montana is a common stony S-type asteroid.

Rotation period 

Between 2003 and 2007, three rotational lightcurves of Montana were obtained from photometric observations made by amateur astronomers René Roy, Horacio Correia, Laurent Bernasconi, and Richard Ditteon. All three lightcurves gave a well-defined rotation period of 4.55 hours with a brightness variation between 0.32 and 0.41 magnitude.

Diameter and albedo 

According to the space-based surveys carried out by the Japanese Akari satellite and NASA's Wide-field Infrared Survey Explorer with its subsequent NEOWISE mission, Montanas surface has an albedo of 0.28–0.35 and its diameter measures between 19.2 and 21.9 kilometers, while the Collaborative Asteroid Lightcurve Link assumes a standard albedo for stony asteroids of 0.20 and calculates a somewhat larger diameter of 25.4 kilometers, as the lower the albedo, the larger the body's diameter at a constant absolute magnitude.

Naming 

This minor planet was named in honor of the Bergedorf Observatory. It was the observatory's first ever made discovery. "Montana" means "mountain village" in Latin and literally translates to "Bergedorf" in German.

References

External links 
 Asteroid Lightcurve Database (LCDB), query form (info )
 Dictionary of Minor Planet Names, Google books
 Asteroids and comets rotation curves, CdR – Observatoire de Genève, Raoul Behrend
 Discovery Circumstances: Numbered Minor Planets (1)-(5000) – Minor Planet Center
 
 

000797
Discoveries by Holger Thiele
Named minor planets
000797
000797
19141117